Białki  is a village in the administrative district of Gmina Sadlinki, within Kwidzyn County, Pomeranian Voivodeship, in northern Poland. 

The village has a population of 453.

Notable residents
 Rudolf Arndt (1835–1900), psychiatrist

References

Villages in Kwidzyn County